Badfinger is the sixth studio album by British rock band Badfinger. The album was recorded in autumn 1973 and released in 1974 on Warner Bros. Records. It was the first of two albums released by the band on the Warner label. The cover art for the album shows a woman wearing a riding outfit and hat from the 1920s and smoking a cigarette in a cigarette holder.

Background
As Badfinger were completing work on their last album for Apple Records, Ass, the band's manager, Stan Polley, signed them to a three-year, six-album deal with Warner Bros. Records. As a result, shortly after the band and producer Chris Thomas completed recording of Ass, they found themselves back in the studio making a new album for Warner.

Release and reception
Originally planned for release on 28 December 1973, the album was delayed due to Ass being issued that month. Although the album is technically untitled, it is referred to as Badfinger as this is its only identification outside its matrix number. The intended title, For Love or Money, was rejected by the label at the time of production and was never used. The intended title referred to Badfinger's label change from Apple to Warner Bros.

On release, Badfinger received an unfavourable review in Rolling Stone magazine. A British single released after the album, "Love Is Easy", failed to chart. A subsequent single issued in the US, "I Miss You", also failed.

In the United States, the album peaked at number 161 on Billboards Top 200 LPs & Tape listings, making it Badfinger's lowest-charting album there. Part of the reason for the poor commercial performance was that, due to litigation with Apple, this album and Ass came out within months of each other; in fact, in the UK, Badfinger actually preceded Ass.

The album was re-released on CD format in the 1990s in Japan and Germany only. The album was eventually issued on CD in the United States in 2007. Many tracks from this album have subsequently been released on various Badfinger compilation records and CDs.

Real Gone Music released an "Expanded" version of the album 30 November 2018. A further expanded edition comprising 40 tracks including those from Wish You Were Here was released 3 January 2020 with the title Shine On 1974.

The album cover was designed by John Kosh.

Track listing
Side one
"I Miss You" (Pete Ham) – 2:36
"Shine On" (Ham, Tom Evans) – 2:52
"Love Is Easy" (Joey Molland) – 3:08
"Song for a Lost Friend" (Ham) – 2:52
"Why Don't We Talk?" (Evans) – 3:45
"Island" (Molland) – 3:40

Side two
"Matted Spam" (Ham) – 3:09
"Where Do We Go from Here?" (Evans) – 3:25
"My Heart Goes Out" (Mike Gibbins) – 3:16
"Lonely You" (Ham) – 3:48
"Give It Up" (Molland) – 4:34
"Andy Norris" (Joey and Kathie Molland) – 2:59

2018 "Expanded" Real Gone Music version
"I Miss You"
"Shine On"
"Love Is Easy"
"Song for a Lost Friend"
"Why Don't We Talk?"
"Island"
"Matted Spam"
"Where Do We Go from Here?"
"My Heart Goes Out"
"Lonely You"
"Give It Up"
"Andy Norris"
"Love My Lady" (Evans) (unreleased song outtake)
"Shine On" (work in progress mix)
"Song for a Lost Friend" (work in progress mix)
"Island" (work in progress mix)
"Matted Spam" (work in progress mix)
"Where Do We Go from Here?" (work in progress mix)
"My Heart Goes Out" (work in progress mix)
"Lonely You" (work in progress mix)
"Give It Up" (work in progress mix)
"Andy Norris" (work in progress mix)

Personnel
Pete Ham – guitar, piano, vocals
Tom Evans – bass, vocals
Joey Molland – guitar, vocals
Mike Gibbins – drums, vocals

Charts

References

Badfinger albums
1974 albums
Albums produced by Chris Thomas (record producer)
Warner Records albums
Albums recorded at Olympic Sound Studios
Albums recorded at AIR Studios